Scott McGregor may refer to a person in:

Business
 Scott A. McGregor (born 1956), American technology executive and philanthropist

Entertainment
 Scott McGregor (actor) (born 1981), Australian model, Neighbours actor and TV presenter
 Scott McGregor (television presenter) (born 1957), Australian actor, television presenter and railway enthusiast
 Scott MacGregor (art director) (1914–1971), British art director

Sports
 Scott McGregor (left-handed pitcher) (born 1954), American Major League Baseball player who pitched for the Baltimore Orioles
 Scott McGregor (basketball) (born 1976), Australian basketball player
 Scott McGregor (right-handed pitcher) (born 1986), American minor league baseball player

Fiction
 Scott McGregor, fictional character in the film 10 Years (2011)
 Scotty McGregor, fictional character in the film The Crazies (2010)

See also
 McGregor W. Scott (born 1962), U.S. lawyer